The Larraín family is an influential Chilean family of Basque origin. Their members include prominent aristocratic politicians and businessmen. The Larrain family first arrived in Chile more than 450 years ago, and they have been part of Chile's history ever since.  The Larrain family form part of a group of families commonly referred to as the 'double-RRs', surnames which include two RRs.

Family origins

The first Larraín to set foot in Chile was the president of the Royal Audience of Quito, Santiago de Larraín y Vicuña in the 17th century.

The family stem from two branches: Santiago de Larraín y Vicuña ("The Marquises" branch) and Martín José de Larraín Vicuña, nephew of the former ("The eight hundred").

Prominent members

Santiago de Larraín y Vicuña, President of the Royal Audiencia of Quito.
José Toribio de Larraín y Guzmán, First Marquis of Larraín.
Pablo Larraín Tejada, a Chilean lawyer, politician and Minister of Economy and Trade.
Juan Larraín, a Chilean diplomat, former Ambassador to the United Nations.
Pablo Larraín, a Chilean film director and screenwriter.
Fernando Larraín Munita, a Chilean humorist.
Fernando Larraín de Toro, a Chilean television actor, comedian.
Felipe Larraín, a Chilean economist.
Paula Larraín, a Chilean-Danish news journalist.
Gabriel Larraín Valdivieso, a Chilean Catholic bishop.
Hernán Larraín, a Chilean politician.
Joaquín Larraín Gandarillas, a Chilean priest.
María Eugenia Larraín, a Chilean female model.
Nicolás Larraín, a Chilean television presenter.
Patricia Larraín, a Chilean actress and TV hostess.
Sara Larraín, a Chilean politician and environmentalist.
Carlos Larraín, a Chilean lawyer and senator-designate of the far right. Staunch defender of dictatorship and constantly denying human rights violations of the military regime during the 70s and 80s. Was instrumental in getting his son, Martin, acquitted of murder charges after criminally manipulating the legal system. 
Teresa Larraín, a Chilean First Lady.
Julita Astaburuaga Larraín, a Chilean socialite.
Emiliano Figueroa Larraín, President of Chile in 1925-1927.
Joaquín Figueroa Larraín, a Chilean politician.
Juan Francisco Fresno Larraín, a Chilean cardinal.
Arturo Matte Larraín, a Chilean lawyer and politician.
Eliodoro Matte Larraín, President of conservative and influential think-tank Public Studies Center (Centro de Estudio Públicos, CEP).
María Patricia Matte Larraín, President of the Primary Instruction Society, owner of several schools for poor children in Santiago.
Claudio Orrego Larraín, a Chilean lawyer and politician.
Ángela Prieto Larraín, a Chilean actress and model.
María José Prieto Larraín, a Chilean actress.
Francisco Ramón Vicuña Larraín, a President of Chile in 1829.
Adolfo Zaldívar Larraín, a Chilean politician and lawyer.
Andrés Zaldívar Larraín, a Chilean Christian Democrat politician.
Antonio Larrain).

Other members of the Larraín family are:

Herminia Arrate Ramírez, a Chilean painter and First Lady during 1932, wife of the President Carlos Dávila Espinoza. Daughter of the Colonel Miguel Arrate Larraín.
Alberto Hurtado Cruchaga, a Chilean Jesuit priest and lawyer. Son of Alberto Hurtado Larraín.
Delfina Guzmán, a Chilean actress. Daughter of Florencio Guzmán Larraín.
Samuel Maquieira Ossa, a Chilean musician, son of Diego Maquieira.
Magdalena Matte Lecaros, a Chilean civil engineer, businesswoman and Minister of Housing and Urban Development under Chile's current President-elect Sebastián Piñera for the term of 2010-2014. She is the granddaughter of Arturo Matte Larraín.
Diego Portales Palazuelos, a Chilean minister and statesman. Son of José Santiago Portales Larraín.
Francisco Ruiz-Tagle Portales, a Chilean politician, President of Chile during 1830. Son of María del Rosario Portales Larraín.
Paz Yrarrázaval Donoso, a Chilean actress. Daughter of the politician Joaquín Yrarrázaval Larraín.
Spencer Larrain High Value Business Consultant
 Martin Larrain - son of Carlos Larrain, ran over and killed Hernan Canales in 2013 with his vehicle while drunk driving. The case was notorious in Chile, since Martin actually fled the crime scene, falsified the autopsy, bribed the wife of the deceased, and ultimately walked free after a second trial.

References

Sources
"La conexión Larraín", La Nación Domingo.
"Manuel Gerardo Larrain"

External links
 Genealogy of the Larraín family in Chile in Genealog.cl (in Spanish)

Chilean families
Chilean families of Basque ancestry
+